Bembidion constricticolle is a species of beetles in the family Carabidae. It is found in Alberta, Canada and the United States.

References

Bousquet, Yves, and André Larochelle (1993). "Catalogue of the Geadephaga (Coleoptera: Trachypachidae, Rhysodidae, Carabidae including Cicindelini) of America North of Mexico". Memoirs of the Entomological Society of Canada, no. 167, 397.

Further reading

Arnett, R.H. Jr., and M. C. Thomas. (eds.). (2000). American Beetles, Volume I: Archostemata, Myxophaga, Adephaga, Polyphaga: Staphyliniformia. CRC Press LLC

Richard E. White. (1983). Peterson Field Guides: Beetles. Houghton Mifflin Company.

External links

constricitcolle
Beetles described in 1897
Beetles of North America